Karesaw is a village in the Kyain Seikgyi Township of the Kayin State, Myanmar.

References

External links
"Karesaw Map  Satellite Images of Karesaw" Maplandia World Gazetteer

Populated places in Kayin State